The lava heron (Butorides sundevalli), also known as the Galápagos heron, is a species of heron endemic to the Galápagos Islands of Ecuador. It is considered by some authorities — including the American Ornithological Society and BirdLife International — to be a subspecies (or even just a colour morph) of the striated heron (B. striata), and was formerly "lumped" with this species and the green heron (B. virescens) as the green-backed heron.

Description
The adult is slate-grey to black, which allows it to blend in with the hardened lava. The back feathers typically have a silvery sheen and it has a short crest on its head. When breeding, the heron has a black beak and bright orange legs, but these fade to grey after the breeding season.

Distribution and habitat
These highly territorial birds are found in intertidal zones and mangrove swamps on all of the islands of Galápagos Province.

Behavior

Diet 
The lava heron stalks small crabs and fish slowly before quickly spearing and eating them. They have also been known to eat the flies that gather near cacti and occasionally smaller birds.

Interactions 
These birds have little fear of humans. It has been noted they have flight behaviors, some of which may carry the purpose of territory defense/advertising.

Calls 
Lava herons are typically seen hunched over and they have a sharp alarm call (described as a scow sound). During aggressive behavior they will use a skuk-skuk call.

Breeding
Unlike most herons, these birds nest in solitary pairs for one breeding season in either the lower branches of mangrove trees or under lava rocks.
 They can breed year-round, though typically from September to March, and can mate up to three times a year and have up to ten eggs each time.

References
Resources

Heinzel, Hermann and Barnaby Hall. Galapagos Diary. Los Angeles; University of California Press, 2000.

lava heron
Endemic birds of the Galápagos Islands
Galápagos Islands coastal fauna
lava heron